Chavusy District (Chaussky raion) is a raion (district) in Mogilev Region, Belarus; the administrative center is the town of Chavusy. As of 2009, its population was 21,242. Population of Chavusy accounts for 50.3% of the district's population.

Notable residents 
Ivan Nasovič (1788 - 1877), author of the first dictionary of the modern Belarusian language.

References

 
Districts of Mogilev Region